Siphonodon celastrineus is a species of plant in the family Celastraceae. It is found in Cambodia, India, Myanmar, and Vietnam.

References

celastrineus
Least concern plants
Taxonomy articles created by Polbot
Plants described in 1844
Flora of Cambodia
Flora of Myanmar
Flora of Vietnam